Hügelland is a type of landscape consisting of low rolling hills whose topography or surface structure lies between that of a lowland region (plains or river terraces) and that of a more rugged hill range or low mountain range.  The term is German and has no exact equivalent in English, but is often translated as "hill country", "hilly terrain", "upland(s)" or "gently undulating" or "rolling country", or "rolling countryside". It is derived from Hügel, a low hill or hillock and appears frequently as a proper name for this type of terrain.

The term Hügelland is not unambiguously defined, even in German. For example, on the plains of North Germany, Poland or Hungary it may be applied to terrain with a height variation of just 50 metres, whilst in the Alpine Foreland or in the Voralpen it might refer to terrain with a height difference of at least 100–200 metres. 
On the other hand, some scholars prefer to define Hügelland by its height above sea level; for example, applying it to terrain between 200 and 500 metres above sea level.

Structure 

Structurally and geomorphologically, a Hügelland landscape has a significant proportion of less well-defined components. For example:
 It is topographically not as clearly defined a mountain or hill range,
 which is why it usually exhibits variable erosion (the aspects of its slopes facing all points of the compass) and
 why it rarely has series of parallel watercourses such as those typically created in hilly or mountainous terrain.
 Settlements may be located either in the valleys or on the heights (which offered sunny sites in winter, sheltered leeward locations and, formerly, better defensive positions);
 Arable usage is equally diverse - depending on soil type, local climate and groundwater.
 The formation of the terrain often has geological causes that differ from those of hills and mountains:

Hills and mountains are caused by folding along tectonic weaknesses or fault lines, which are then followed by rivers. This results in a parallel pattern, which can be made even more regular through erosion. Hügelland rarely exhibits these properties.

When the gently rolling hills of a Hügelland are suitable for agriculture, their small-scale nature is further reinforced, which may result in a colourful succession of mixed forest and open areas with pastures, meadows, arable crops and orchards, divided by hedgerows along the tracks, lanes and embankments. Mixed woodland, hedges, ponds and scattered settlements occur, giving the appearance of a mosaic from the air.

Regions named Hügelland 
The regions listed below have Hügelland as part of their proper name. Several also have alternative English-language names.
 Austria: 
 Mattersburger Hügelland, Burgenland
 Oststeirisches Hügelland, Styria
 Germany:
 Aachener Hügelland, North Rhine-Westphalia
 Alzeyer Hügelland, Rhineland-Palatinate
 Angelner Hügelland, Schleswig-Holstein
 Mittelsächsisches Hügelland, Saxony
 Nordthüringer Hügelland, Thuringia
 Ostbraunschweigisches Hügelland, Lower Saxony
 Schleswig-Holsteinisches Hügelland, Schleswig-Holstein
 Spalter Hügelland, Bavaria
 Unterbayerisches Hügelland, Bavaria
 Switzerland
 Freiburger Hügelland

Other examples 

 Austria: 
 Upper Austria: Innviertel, Hausruckviertel
 Lower Austria: Bucklige Welt, parts of Mostviertel; Weinviertel, Wienerwaldsee
 South Burgenland
 SE-Carinthia
 Germany
 Baden-Württemberg: Jagst-Ries, Kraichgau
 Bavaria: Haßlacherbergkette in North-Upper Franconia, Middle Franconia, Upper Swabia
 Brandenburg/Saxony-Anhalt: Fläming
 Rhineland-Palatinate: Rhenish Hesse
 Lower Saxony: Lüneburg Heath
 Mecklenburg-Vorpommern: Baltic Uplands, Feldberg Lake District, Mecklenburg Switzerland
 North Rhine-Westphalia: Baumberge and Beckum Hills, Münsterland
 Saxony: Lower Lusatia, North Saxony
 Schleswig-Holstein: Holstein Switzerland, Hütten Hills
 Italy:
 The Langhe in the Piemont, between Turin and the Ligurian Alps
 Poland:
 Pomeranian Lakeland, Prussian-, Baltic Uplands
 Lower Silesia, Lodz region
 Switzerland
 Parts of the Jura
 Swiss Plateau, Napf
 Hungary, Rumania, Serbia
 Göcsej, Raabtal, Balaton-South; Buda Hills, Zemplín
 Slavonia, Batschka, Banat, Siebenbürgen, Dobruja

Similar concepts

An example of Hügelland outside Europe is Rwanda in Africa, whose character is expressed by its French name of Pays de Mille Collines ("Land of a Thousand Hills"). In Sweden the term undulating hilly land is used since Sten Rudberg coined the concept in 1960. In the Swedish context this means hilly areas made up of crystalline rocks of the Baltic Shield that are often contrasted with joint valley landscapes, the Sub-Cambrian peneplain and plains with residual hills. In southern Sweden the undulating hilly lands are coterminous with the Sub-Mesozoic hilly peneplains, an ancient surface formed by weathering in warm and humid climates during the Mesozoic.

References 

Landforms